Ussadate Sutthikunkarn (born May 16, 1981 in Bangkok) is a Thai taekwondo practitioner, who competed in the men's flyweight category. He claimed the gold medal in the men's flyweight division at the 2001 Southeast Asian Games in Kuala Lumpur, Malaysia, and later represented his nation Thailand at the 2004 Summer Olympics.

Sutthikunkarn qualified for the Thai squad in the men's flyweight class (58 kg) at the 2004 Summer Olympics in Athens, by defeating Vietnam's Nguyễn Quốc Huân for the top spot and securing a berth from the Asian Olympic Qualifying Tournament in his native Bangkok. He fell short in an adverse 2–5 defeat to Greek crowd favorite and reigning Olympic champion Michail Mouroutsos during his opening match. When Mouroutsos was mercilessly beaten by Egypt's Tamer Bayoumi in the quarterfinals, Sutthikunkarn denied his chance to proceed into the repechage for the Olympic bronze medal.

References

External links

1981 births
Living people
Ussadate Sutthikunkarn
Ussadate Sutthikunkarn
Taekwondo practitioners at the 2004 Summer Olympics
Ussadate Sutthikunkarn
Taekwondo practitioners at the 2002 Asian Games
Ussadate Sutthikunkarn
Southeast Asian Games medalists in taekwondo
Competitors at the 2001 Southeast Asian Games
Ussadate Sutthikunkarn